The 1923 Tennessee Volunteers football team (variously "Tennessee", "UT" or the "Vols") represented the University of Tennessee in the 1923 college football season. Playing as a member of the Southern Conference (SoCon), the team was led by head coach M. B. Banks, in his third year, and played their home games at Shields–Watkins Field in Knoxville, Tennessee. The 1922 Vols won five, lost four, and tied one game (5–4–1 overall, 4–3 in the SoCon). Playing all but four games at home, the 1923 Vols were outscored by their opponents 167 to 82 and were shut out three times.

Schedule

References

Tennessee
Tennessee Volunteers football seasons
Tennessee Volunteers football